High View Park (also known as "Halls Hill") is a neighborhood in Arlington, Virginia, United States.  Its approximate borders are Langston Boulevard (formerly Lee Highway) to the north, North George Mason Drive to the west, Slater Park to the east.  The southern boundary is a wall, built in the 1930s to separate it from the white neighborhood of Woodlawn Park (now Waycroft-Woodlawn).

History 
Prior to the Civil War, the area was owned by a slaveholder named Bazil Hall.  During the war, the area was repeatedly ravaged by troops from both sides.  Hall was eventually reimbursed approximately $10,000 for damages.   After the war, Hall sold much of the property to former slaves.

The area was later merged with an adjacent area known as High View Park.

Hall's Hill 
Hall's Hill was a walled enclave, in segregated Arlington County. In 2019, part of the wall was damaged. Residents could shop at Lee Highway (now Langston Boulevard) and Glebe Road. There was a volunteer fire station, Halls Hill Volunteer Fire Department , since there was not county fire service until 1951. In 2016, an historic marker was erected.

There were sit-ins at the People Drug store counter. The first four African-American students to integrate public schools in Virginia were residents of High View Park, attending the formerly all-white Stratford Junior High School in February 1959.  Douglas E. Moore served as pastor of the Calloway Church in High View Park for three years.

References

External links 

 Hall's Hill Today

Neighborhoods in Arlington County, Virginia